The North Carolina Arts Council is an organization in the U.S. state of North Carolina that provides grants to artists, musicians and arts organizations. The group's mission is "arts for all people." It was founded by executive order in 1964 by Governor Terry Sanford, and it became a statutory state agency on April 11, 1967. It is an agency of the North Carolina Department of Natural and Cultural Resources, which is the United States' first cabinet-level state agency for the arts, history and libraries. It operates from headquarters in Raleigh.

The organization's first chair was Sam Ragan, followed by Martin Lancaster. Each year since 1989 it has presented the North Carolina Folk Heritage Award. The agency issues a number of grants to support artists and arts organizations in North Carolina. 

On June 21, 2017, the study "Arts & Economic Prosperity 5: The Economic Impact of Nonprofit Arts and Culture Organizations and Their Audiences in North Carolina." was released.  It showed the nonprofit arts and culture sector in North Carolina generated $2.12 billion in direct economic activity and supported almost 72,000 full time jobs in 2015.  The North Carolina Arts Council sponsored the study and partnered with Americans for the Arts on the study.

See also
ARTS North Carolina

References

External links

Arts councils of the United States
Art in North Carolina
1964 establishments in North Carolina
Arts organizations established in 1964